Meagan Yvonne Tandy (born May 3, 1985)  is an American actress and model.  She is a former Miss California USA who placed as third runner-up at Miss USA 2007. As an actress, she had long running roles in Jane by Design, Teen Wolf, Survivor's Remorse, and recently starred as Sophie Moore on The CW's Batwoman.

Early life and pageant career 
Tandy, born in Fremont, California and raised in Fontana, graduated from Etiwanda High School in Rancho Cucamonga. She was a student at Chaffey College, and is the first student from this school to win the Miss California USA title.

Tandy studied business and film production at Chaffey College for two years where she had to produce, create and edit several commercials and short film projects for the class.  While there, Tandy landed a job as a stand-in for December 2003 wedding of "Trista and Ryan", from Season 1 of The Bachelorette.  Although a fan of the show, Tandy said being a stand-in for the Live wedding was a "terrible" experience and has never worked as a stand-in since.  After receiving associate degrees at Chaffey, Tandy attended Cal Poly Pomona where she worked on a degree in business management and marketing.

Tandy won the Miss California USA title in a state pageant held in San Rafael, California on October 15, 2006.  It was her second attempt at the title, as she has placed fourth runner-up to Tamiko Nash the previous year. Tandy also won the Best Swimsuit Award in the 2007 Miss California USA pageant.

Tandy competed in the Miss USA 2007 pageant, placing 3rd runner-up.  Her evening wear gown was created by Nick Verreos, a participant on Season 2 of Project Runway. She was only the fourth African-American Miss California USA and the first African-American to succeed another African-American titleholder.

Entertainment career 
Tandy is a member of the Screen Actors Guild. She filmed several television commercials for national campaigns, including Wendy's, Boost Mobile and a Super Bowl commercial for Pepsi Max. Tandy appeared in a movie promotion for the 2007 film Shrek the Third. Tandy had her first film role in the 2010 movie Unstoppable, briefly appearing as a Hooters waitress who is a lead character's daughter.

She temporarily hosted as an online correspondent for E! News.

In May 2012, Tandy founded her own program for teens called "GIRL TALK" where she collaborated with the Women On The Move Network of Rancho Cucamonga.  The 1st Annual "GIRL TALK" seminar was held in July 2013.

Tandy currently resides in Los Angeles where she continues her acting career.  She played Lulu Pope on the ABC Family show Jane By Design. Tandy appeared in Piranha DD, where she played Ashley Sorby, who meets a gruesome demise. Tandy also appeared in Trey Songz music video single called Simply Amazing from his new album Chapter V.

In June 2013, she made her debut onto the MTV supernatural drama series Teen Wolf where she played the recurring and fan-favorite role of Braeden for 3 seasons.

In 2014, she played Sabrina on the teen medical dramedy series Red Band Society, cancelled after 10 episodes. In 2015, she joined the cast of the sitcom Survivor's Remorse, playing the recurring role of Allison Pierce, for the second through fourth seasons. In 2016, Tandy played Chantal for the second season of the dramedy television series UnREAL. From 2019 to 2022, she was a regular on The CW's Batwoman as Sophie Moore.

Filmography

Film

Television

Music videos

References

External links 

Miss California USA official website
Miss USA official website
 the Meagan Tandy Foundation
 

Living people
African-American actresses
African-American female models
American actresses
Miss USA 2007 delegates
Female models from California
People from Fremont, California
1985 births
21st-century African-American women
21st-century African-American people
20th-century African-American people
20th-century African-American women